Haim Bodek is an American developer of trading software, and the son of physicist Arie Bodek. He worked for Hull Trading Company which was acquired by Goldman Sachs in 1999. He became the global head of Electronic Volatility Trading at UBS by 2006, and later established his own company Trading Machines. When his software started losing money in 2009, he tracked the cause to an undocumented order type which was being used by other algorithmic trading companies to gain an advantage over other traders. He exposed the situation with a complaint in 2011 to the Securities and Exchange Commission, which resulted in BATS Global Markets paying a record $14 million fine.

A 2013 documentary film, The Wall Street Code, recounted Bodek's  investigation of  the illicit trading strategies.

References

American stock traders
Living people
American computer programmers
Year of birth missing (living people)